The Zolfaghar missile is an Iranian road-mobile, single-stage, solid-propelled SRBM named after Zulfiqar the sword of Ali ibn Abi Talib. It is believed to be derived from the Fateh-110 SRBM family (possibly the Fateh-313 missile). The Aerospace Industries Organization unveiled the. weapon in 2016. It entered service in 2017. It was first used in the 2017 Deir ez-Zor missile strike and was therefore one of the first used mid-range missiles since 30 years.

Design 
According to Iranian sources, the Zolfaghar missile has a length of 10.3m, a diameter of 0.68m, and a launch weight of 4620kg with a warhead weighing 579kg that is designed to separate in midcourse phase, making it more difficult to detect, track and intercept than unibody missiles like the 9K720 Iskander.

History
It was first unveiled during a military parade aboard a vehicle decorated with an anti-Zionist banner on 25 September 2016 after which Defense Minister Hossein Dehqan claimed that the missile had a range of 700 km. The Iranian Ministry of Defense would later on release a video of its testing. On 17 June 2017 Iran launched six Zolfaghar missiles into Syria towards the Deir ez-Zor region on ISIS targets as a response to the attack in Tehran on 8 June 2017.

In February 2019 Iran unveiled a new longer range version of the Zolfaghar missile called the Dezful missile with a range of 1000 km, this is an MRBM.

On 7 March 2021, Yemeni Houthi attacked different locations in Saudi Arabia with ballistic missiles and armed drones with a Zolfaghar ballistic missile along with several Samad-3 loitering munitions targeted the Aramco oil facilities at Ras Tanura.

Operators

State-operators

Future operators 

  – An intelligence assessment shared in October 2022 with Ukrainian and U.S. officials contended that Iran’s armaments industry was preparing a first shipment of Fateh-110 and Zolfaghar missiles to Russia. Western media reported the sale was confirmed by the Iranian side later in October. Iran rejected the Western "media hype" over the delivery of Iranian missiles to Russia. The foreign minister said that "what they have said about the missiles is completely wrong."

See also 
 Fateh-110
 Fateh-313
 Dezful (missile)
 List of military equipment manufactured in Iran
 Science and technology in Iran

References

Short-range ballistic missiles of Iran
Surface-to-surface missiles of Iran
Theatre ballistic missiles
Military equipment introduced in the 2010s